Kathleen Jennings (born 1952/1953) is an American lawyer and politician serving as the Attorney General of Delaware. She is a member of the Democratic Party.

Early life and education
Jennings earned a Bachelor of Arts degree from the University of Delaware and Juris Doctor the Villanova University School of Law.

Career 
She worked for the Delaware Department of Justice for twenty years as a state prosecutor and chief deputy attorney general. Among other cases, she successfully tried serial killer Steven Brian Pennell. In 1995, she and Charles Oberly opened their own law firm.

Jennings served as Chief Administrative Officer for New Castle County for one year. She resigned in January 2018 to run for Attorney General of Delaware. She won the Democratic Party nomination. She defeated Republican Bernard Pepukayi in the general election, and was sworn into office on January 1, 2019.

In the 2022 election, Jennings won a second term in a closer election, defeating Republican Julianne Murray with 53 percent of the vote.

Electoral history

References

External links

 Government website
 Campaign website

1950s births
20th-century American lawyers
20th-century American women lawyers
21st-century American lawyers
21st-century American women
Delaware Attorneys General
Delaware Democrats
Delaware lawyers
Living people
University of Delaware alumni
Villanova University School of Law alumni
Women in Delaware politics
Year of birth missing (living people)